Evgeni Gennadyevich Kabaev (born 28 February 1988)  is a Russian professional footballer who plays for Samutsongkhram in the Thai League 3 as a forward.

Kabaev has been the top scorer of Estonian Meistriliiga twice, in 2014 and 2016 season.

Club career
He made his debut in the Russian Second Division for FC Petrotrest St. Petersburg on 18 April 2011 in a game against FC Karelia Petrozavodsk.

In 2014, he is Top Scorer of Estonia Top Level and The Best Player of Estonia top level, with 36 goals.

On 3 December 2014 Kabaev joined Indonesian club Persija Jakarta, but the league season in Indonesia got canceled.

On 8 January 2017, Kabaev signed a two-year contract with Czech club Bohemians 1905.

On 17 July 2019, Kabaev joined Estonian Club FCI Levadia. On July 29, Kabaev was arrested for driving 42 km/h over the speed limit. He spent two days in jail. As he had not paid two previous fines for speeding, Kabaev's visa was cancelled, the player was deported and he was banned from entering the Schengen area for one year.

After being released from contract with Levadia Kabaev signed with Honduran club C.D. Real de Minas.

References

External links 
 
 
Thaileague Official Website: Samutsongkhram F.C. Players

1988 births
Living people
Russian footballers
Association football forwards
Oulun Palloseura players
FC Lootus Kohtla-Järve players
JK Sillamäe Kalev players
Persija Jakarta players
FC SKA-Khabarovsk players
FC Petrotrest players
C.D. Real de Minas players
Meistriliiga players
Liga 1 (Indonesia) players
Liga Nacional de Fútbol Profesional de Honduras players
Russian First League players
Russian Second League players
Russian expatriate footballers
Expatriate footballers in Estonia
Expatriate footballers in Indonesia
Expatriate footballers in Finland
Expatriate footballers in Honduras
Expatriate footballers in Thailand
FCI Levadia Tallinn players
Evgeni Kabaev
Evgeni Kabaev
Evgeni Kabaev
Evgeni Kabaev
Evgeni Kabaev
Russian expatriate sportspeople in Estonia
Russian expatriate sportspeople in Finland
Russian expatriate sportspeople in Thailand